Edward Lawry Norton (July 28, 1898 – January 28, 1983) was an accomplished engineer and scientist. He worked at Bell Labs  and is known for Norton's theorem.  

His areas of active research included network theory, acoustical systems, electromagnetic apparatus, and data transmission. A graduate of MIT and Columbia University, he held nineteen patents on his work.

Edward L. Norton is best remembered for development of the dual of Thevenin's equivalent circuit, currently referred to as Norton's equivalent Circuit. 

He was interested in communications circuit theory and the transmission of data at high speeds over telephone lines. Norton began his telephone career in 1922 with the western Electric Company's Engineering Department (which later became Bell Laboratories).

Biography
He attended the University of Maine for two years before transferring to M.I.T. and received a S.B. degree (electrical engineering) in 1922. He received an M.A. degree from Columbia University in 1925.

Work 
Norton and his associates at AT&T in the early 1920s are recognized as some of the first to perform pioneering work applying Thevenin's equivalent circuit and who referred to this concept simply as Thévenin's theorem. 

In 1926, he proposed the equivalent circuit using a current source and parallel resistor to assist in the design of recording instrumentation that was primarily current driven.

Death
Norton died on January 28, 1983, in King James Nursing Home, Chatham, New Jersey.

External links

Edward L. Norton Short biographical sketch.  Includes photographs and quotations.
Origins of the Equivalent Circuit Concept by Don H. Johnson Includes photos and biographical sketches of Norton and other inventors of the "equivalent circuit" concept.

1898 births
Columbia School of Engineering and Applied Science alumni
1983 deaths
Scientists at Bell Labs
People from Rockland, Maine
20th-century American engineers

Massachusetts Institute of Technology alumni